Koulibaly is a surname. Notable people with the surname include:

Abdulai Koulibaly (born 1995), Liberian footballer
Kalidou Koulibaly (born 1991), French/Senegalese footballer
Mamadou Koulibaly (born 1957), Ivorian politician
Paul Koulibaly (born 1986), Burkinabé footballer
Pierre Koulibaly (born 1986), Burkinabé footballer

See also
 Coulibaly
Bambara-language surnames